The 2006 Terek Grozny season was the first season that the club played back in the Russian Football National League following their relegation from the Russian Premier League at the end of the 2005 Season.

Season review

Squad

Transfers

In

Loans in

Out

Competitions

First Division

Results by round

Results

League table

Russian Cup

2005–06

2006–07

Squad statistics

Appearances and goals

|-
|colspan="14"|Players away from the club on loan:
|-
|colspan="14"|Players who appeared for Terek Grozny but left during the season:

|}

Goal scorers

Clean sheets

Disciplinary record

References

FC Akhmat Grozny seasons
Akhmat Grozny